The Dead Air Fresheners are a Portland, Oregon, Olympia, Washington, and Seattle, Washington-based experimental and post-punk musical group with a somewhat fluctuating membership. They have been described by Portland's KPSU as "A long-time mainstay of the Experimental Rock Scene." They count Sun Ra, John Cage, Sonic Youth, Sun City Girls, and Jandek as influences.

Band history

The band formed around 1996. They claim to have first formed "in a dilapidated beachfront mansion on the Eld Inlet in Thurston County, Washington" (Eld Inlet is the site of The Evergreen State College); in any event, they first performed publicly in the late 1990s at Olympia, Washington's annual Olympia Experimental Music Festival.

Their instrumentation has been known to include Moog synthesizer, and tape samples, drums, ambient vocals, distorted feedback, electric guitar, computers and digital toys, and digeridoo. The Dead Air Fresheners state in interviews and on their My Space page that they do not play improvised music despite frequent perceptions to the contrary. Rather they use a process of Chance Music composition influenced by the work of John Cage (also called Indeterminate music) and their Myspace page provides several examples of scores from past performances.

They have done several live radio performances; portions of their hour-long session with poet Chuck Swaim on KEXP's "Sonarchy Radio" were included as songs in the self-released album Pleasure Is Where All Labor Ends and two performances on KPSU are on that station's archives.

Band members
Because of their penchant for anonymity, masks, and costumes, there is no definitive list of the group's membership. Nonetheless, several publications covering either the experimental music scene or entertainment in the Pacific Northwest have reported them to have included at various times members of such bands as Olympia's now defunct Karp, Austin, Texas' ...And You Will Know Us By the Trail of Dead, Bellingham, Washington's Noggin, and Portland, Oregon's Nice Nice.
In Signum magazine, writer Tiffany Lee Brown implies strongly that Olympia Experimental Music Festival founder Jim McAdams is one of the anonymous musicians in the group. Matt Driscoll of the Weekly Volcano (South Puget Sound) states this outright. Emily Pothast in The Wire states that Ricardo Wang, host of the "What's this Called?" program on Freeform Portland Radio is a member.

McAdams's wife, Deanne Rowley McAdams, died 3 August 2011. Her obituary in The Olympian indicates that she was a member of the group, and that she had also played with Texas and Pacific Northwest bands Plain Jane, [...And You Will Know Us By the] Trail of Dead, Pro-Ex Marauders, and Cherry 2000, and that she had a band of her own called Leopards.

Discography

 I Try To Show My Love, Plastic Duck Records, 1999
 Verses of Echo, Bastard Customer, and Pleasure Is Where All Labor Ends, with poet Chuck Swaim, (self-released) 2001–2003
 An Ulcer is a String of Pearls, 2006, Kill Pop Tarts (CDR-ep)
 a Slip Inside the Quiet Room, 2007, Icky Recordings
 Separated by Commas, 2010, Dubuque Strange Music Society (collaborations with various other artists; CDR)
 Extension Cord Symphony 9, (Postmoderncore, 2016)
 Fast Radio Bursts, Personal Archives (Dubuque, Iowa, 8 August 2016)
 Evidence of Superstructures II (Postmoderncore, 2017)
 Brother Calls (Postmoderncore, 2019)
 Come On Get Happy (Kill Pop Tarts, 2021)
 Here’s to Letting Go, Bob Bucko Jr. with the Dead Air Fresheners (Kill Pop Tarts, 2021)
 A Collection of Drone & Noise Sea Shanties (Personal Archives, 2021) 
 The Last Asteroid (Kill Pop Tarts, 2022)
 tape hiss is the blow job of lo-fi (Kill Pop Tarts, 2022)
 Noise + Air = Noir, Noisepoet Nobody & Dead Air Fresheners (Kill Pop Tarts 2022) 
 Unfriended (Personal Archives 2022)
 Tales from the Elusive Hangar  (Kill Pop Tarts 2023)

Also included in compilations:
 Infamous Polywogs Vol. 1?, Inlet Recordings, 2002
 Infamous Polywogs Vol. 2?, Kill Pop Tarts, 2004
 Reek of Influence, Icky Recordings, 2006
 "Five Minutes in Dog Years" track on compilation Winter Copulation 2016 (SDM-032), SadoDaMascus Records (Portland, Oregon, 2016)
Source for discography (except as noted):

Notes

References
 .
 .
 .
 .
 .

External links

 Dead Air Fresheners MySpace page
 Recordings by Dead Air Fresheners on the KPSU archives.
 KMLP archive including a 2002 performance by the Dead Air Fresheners. Archived on the Internet Archive February 10, 2006.
 Dead Air Fresheners on Hollow Earth Radio, Seattle, Washington, October 13, 2014
 Dead Air Fresheners on Midvalley Mutations with host Austin Rich, KMUZ, Salem Oregon, May 17, 2019, 
 Dead Air Fresheners on Top Dollar Hour with Tunacan Jones, radionope.com, Spokane, Washington, June 21, 2019
 Dead Air Fresheners on Backyard Deep Dive with host Eric Muhs, KBFG, Seattle, Washington February 2019.

American ambient music groups
American electronic musicians
Experimental musical groups
American post-punk music groups
Musical groups from Olympia, Washington